Gaipa is a surname. Notable people with the surname include:

Amy Gaipa (born 1970), American actress
Corrado Gaipa (1925–1989), Italian actor and voice actor

Surnames of Italian origin